Inspur, whose full name is Inspur Group (Chinese:  浪潮集团; pinyin: Làngcháo Jítuán), is an information technology conglomerate in mainland China focusing on cloud computing, big data, key application hosts, servers, storage, artificial intelligence and ERP. On April 18, 2006, Inspur changed its English name from Langchao to Inspur. It is listed on the SSE, SZSE, and SEHK.

History 
In 2005, Microsoft invested US$20 million in the company. Inspur announced several agreements with virtualization software developer VMware on research and development of cloud computing technologies and related products. In 2009, Inspur acquired the Xi'an-based research and development facilities of Qimonda AG for 30 million Chinese yuan (around US$4 million). The centre had been responsible for design and development of Qimonda's DRAM products.

In 2011, Shandong Inspur Software Co., Ltd., Inspur Electronic Information Co., Ltd. and Inspur (Shandong) Electronic Information Company, established a cloud computing joint venture, with each holding a third.

U.S. sanctions 

In June 2020, the United States Department of Defense published a list of Chinese companies operating in the U.S. that have ties to the People's Liberation Army, which included Inspur. In November 2020, Donald Trump issued an executive order prohibiting any American company or individual from owning shares in companies that the U.S. Department of Defense has listed as having links to the People's Liberation Army.

In March 2023, the United States Department of Commerce added Inspur to the Bureau of Industry and Security's Entity List.

References

External links 

 

Chinese brands
Companies based in Jinan
Companies established in 2000
Computer hardware companies
Multinational companies headquartered in China
Software companies of China
Defence companies of the People's Republic of China